Dimorphotheca pluvialis, common names white African daisy, Cape marigold, weather prophet, Cape rain-daisy, ox-eye daisy, Cape daisy or rain daisy, is a plant species native to South Africa and Namibia. It is sparingly naturalized in scattered locations in California.

Dimorphotheca pluvialis is an annual herb up to 40 cm (16 in) tall. It has long, narrow leaves, sometimes entire but sometimes toothed or pinnately lobed. Ray flowers are white to yellowish, sometimes with blue or purple markings. Disc flowers are usually white to yellowish with purple tips.

References

External links
photo of herbarium specimen at Missouri Botanical Garden, collected in South Africa

pluvialis
Flora of Namibia
Flora of South Africa
Garden plants of Southern Africa
Plants described in 1753
Taxa named by Carl Linnaeus